Naturally is the second album by American funk band Sharon Jones & The Dap-Kings, released on January 25, 2005 on Daptone Records.

Track listing
All songs written by Bosco Mann, except as noted.
"How Do I Let a Good Man Down?" – 3:02
"Natural Born Lover" – 3:04
"Stranded in Your Love" – 5:47 (featuring Lee Fields)
"My Man Is a Mean Man" – 3:16
"You're Gonna Get It" – 4:59
"How Long Do I Have to Wait for You?" – 4:03
"This Land Is Your Land" (Woody Guthrie) – 4:31
"Your Thing Is a Drag" – 3:33
"Fish in the Dish" – 3:18
"All Over Again" – 4:43

Personnel
Sharon Jones – Vocals
El Michels – Baritone Saxophone
Neal Sugarman – Tenor Saxophone
Dave Guy – Trumpet
Homer "Funky-Foot" Steiweiss – Drums
Binky Griptite – Guitar, Emcee, Back-up Vocals
Boogaloo Velez – Congas
Tommy "TNT" Brenneck – Guitar, Piano
Bosco "Bass" Mann – Bass, Piano, Vibes, Tambourine, Bandleader

Also featuring:
Lee Fields – vocals on "Stranded in Your Love"
Alex Kadvan – Cello
Antoine Silverman – Violin
Entcho Todorov – Violin
Stuart D. Bogie – Jaw Harp on "Fish In My Dish
Earl Maxton (Victor Axelrod) – Organ on "All Over Again"

References

External links
 Daptone Records Website

2005 albums
Sharon Jones & The Dap-Kings albums
Daptone Records albums